Style is the fifth studio album by Japanese rock band Luna Sea, released on April 22, 1996. It was the band's last on the record label MCA Victor, became their first number one on the Oricon Albums Chart, and charted for 21 weeks. In 1996, it was certified Platinum by the RIAJ for sales over 400,000.

Overview 
Style was supported with Luna Sea embarking on the sold out Un Ending Style tour, which opened with two consecutive concerts at Yokohama Arena and continued for 16 concerts in nine locations, and mobilized an audience of over one hundred thousand people. It was continued in October with the Un Ending Style ~To Rise~ tour, 28 concerts in smaller venues, and ended with a Christmas concert on December 23, titled , at the outdoor Yokohama Stadium. During the concert it was announced that the band would have a temporary year break in 1997 for each member to pursue solo careers

The single versions of "End of Sorrow" and "Luv U" (b-side of "Desire") are slightly different from the album's.

"G." was used as the theme song of the 1999 24 Hours of Le Mans.

"End of Sorrow" was covered by Yu-Ki & DJ Koo of TRF for the 2007 Luna Sea Memorial Cover Album -Re:birth-.

"In Silence" features singer Akino Arai during the chorus. It was used as the theme song for season one of the Japanese dub of the American television drama Chicago Hope.

The album was remastered and re-released by Universal Music Group on December 5, 2007, it came with a DVD of the promotional videos for "End of Sorrow", "Desire" and "In Silence". This version reached number 218 on the Oricon chart.

Style and the band's other seven major label studio albums, up to Luv, were released on vinyl record for the first time on May 29, 2019.

Track listing

Personnel 
Luna Sea
Ryuichi – vocals
Sugizo – guitar, violin
Inoran – guitar
J – bass
Shinya – drums

Other
Akino Arai – chorus
Yukiko Sakanoue – female voice
Shinozaki Group – strings
Daisuke Kikuchi – programming, synthesizer, strings arrangement

References 

Luna Sea albums
1996 albums